Rory L. Johnson (born March 15, 1986) is an American football linebacker who is currently playing for the Berlin Rebels in the German Football League (GFL). He was signed by the Green Bay Packers as an undrafted free agent in 2007. He played college football at Mississippi.

Johnson has also been a member of the New York Giants and Edmonton Eskimos.

College career
Johnson then attended Hinds Community College where he earned junior college honorable mention All-America honors before transferring to the University of Mississippi for one season.

Professional career

Green Bay Packers
After going undrafted in the 2007 NFL Draft, Johnson signed with the Green Bay Packers on May 4, 2007. On September 1, he was released by the Packers in order to get their roster down to the league maximum.

Edmonton Eskimos
Johnson was signed by the Edmonton Eskimos on May 6, 2009. He was released on June 6, 2009.

Berlin Rebels
Since 2010 Johnson has played in the German Football League for the Berlin Rebels and the Berlin Adler. He currently is playing for the Rebels as of 2021.

References

External links
Ole Miss Rebels bio

1986 births
Living people

American expatriate players of American football
American expatriate sportspeople in Canada
American expatriate sportspeople in Germany
American football linebackers
American players of Canadian football
Edmonton Elks players
German Football League players
Green Bay Packers players
Hinds Eagles football players
New York Giants players
Ole Miss Rebels football players
Sportspeople from Vicksburg, Mississippi